Neural engineering (also known as neuroengineering) is a discipline within biomedical engineering that uses engineering techniques to understand, repair, replace, or enhance neural systems. Neural engineers are uniquely qualified to solve design problems at the interface of living neural tissue and non-living constructs (Hetling, 2008).

Overview 
The field of neural engineering draws on the fields of computational neuroscience, experimental neuroscience, neurology, electrical engineering and signal processing of living neural tissue, and encompasses elements from robotics, cybernetics, computer engineering, neural tissue engineering, materials science, and nanotechnology.

Prominent goals in the field include restoration and augmentation of human function via direct interactions between the nervous system and artificial devices.

Much current research is focused on understanding the coding and processing of information in the sensory and motor systems, quantifying how this processing is altered in the pathological state, and how it can be manipulated through interactions with artificial devices including brain–computer interfaces and neuroprosthetics.

Other research concentrates more on investigation by experimentation, including the use of neural implants connected with external technology.

Neurohydrodynamics is a division of neural engineering that focuses on hydrodynamics of the neurological system.

History 
As neural engineering is a relatively new field, information and research relating to it is comparatively limited, although this is changing rapidly. The first journals specifically devoted to neural engineering, The Journal of Neural Engineering and The Journal of NeuroEngineering and Rehabilitation both emerged in 2004. International conferences on neural engineering have been held by the IEEE since 2003, from 29 April until 2 May 2009 in Antalya, Turkey 4th Conference on Neural Engineering, the 5th International IEEE EMBS Conference on Neural Engineering in April/May 2011 in Cancún, Mexico, and the 6th conference in San Diego, California in November 2013. The 7th conference was held in April 2015 in Montpellier. The 8th conference was held in May 2017 in Shanghai.

Fundamentals 
The fundamentals behind neuroengineering involve the relationship of neurons, neural networks, and nervous system functions to quantifiable models to aid the development of devices that could interpret and control signals and produce purposeful responses.

Neuroscience 
Messages that the body uses to influence thoughts, senses, movements, and survival are directed by nerve impulses transmitted across brain tissue and to the rest of the body.  
Neurons are the basic functional unit of the nervous system and are highly specialized cells that are capable of sending these signals that operate high and low level functions needed for survival and quality of life.  Neurons have special electro-chemical properties that allow them to process information and then transmit that information to other cells.  Neuronal activity is dependent upon neural membrane potential and the changes that occur along and across it.  
A constant voltage, known as the membrane potential, is normally maintained by certain concentrations of specific ions across neuronal membranes. Disruptions or variations in this voltage create an imbalance, or polarization, across the membrane.  Depolarization of the membrane past its threshold potential generates an action potential, which is the main source of signal transmission, known as neurotransmission of the nervous system.  An action potential results in a cascade of ion flux down and across an axonal membrane, creating an effective voltage spike train or "electrical signal" which can transmit further electrical changes in other cells.  
Signals can be generated by electrical, chemical, magnetic, optical, and other forms of stimuli that influence the flow of charges, and thus voltage levels across neural membranes (He 2005).

Engineering 
Engineers employ quantitative tools that can be used for understanding and interacting with complex neural systems.  Methods of studying and generating chemical, electrical, magnetic, and optical signals responsible for extracellular field potentials and synaptic transmission in neural tissue aid researchers in the modulation of neural system activity (Babb et al. 2008). 
To understand properties of neural system activity, engineers use signal processing techniques and computational modeling (Eliasmith & Anderson 2003).  To process these signals, neural engineers must translate the voltages across neural membranes into corresponding code, a process known as neural coding. Neural coding  studies on how the brain encodes simple commands in the form of central pattern generators (CPGs), movement vectors, the cerebellar internal model, and somatotopic maps to understand movement and sensory phenomena. Decoding of these signals in the realm of neuroscience is the process by which neurons understand the voltages that have been transmitted to them.  Transformations involve the mechanisms that signals of a certain form get interpreted and then translated into another form.  Engineers look to mathematically model these transformations (Eliasmith & Anderson 2003).  
There are a variety of methods being used to record these voltage signals.  These can be intracellular or extracellular.  Extracellular methods involve single-unit recordings, extracellular field potentials, and amperometry; more recently, multielectrode arrays have been used to record and mimic signals.

Scope

Neuromechanics 
Neuromechanics is the coupling of neurobiology, biomechanics, sensation and perception, and robotics (Edwards 2010). Researchers are using advanced techniques and models to study the mechanical properties of neural tissues and their effects on the tissues' ability to withstand and generate force and movements as well as their vulnerability to traumatic loading (Laplaca & Prado 2010). This area of research focuses on translating the transformations of information among the neuromuscular and skeletal systems to develop functions and governing rules relating to operation and organization of these systems (Nishikawa et al. 2007). Neuromechanics can be simulated by connecting computational models of neural circuits to models of animal bodies situated in virtual physical worlds (Edwards 2010). Experimental analysis of biomechanics including the kinematics and dynamics of movements, the process and patterns of motor and sensory feedback during movement processes, and the circuit and synaptic organization of the brain responsible for motor control are all currently being researched to understand the complexity of animal movement. Dr. Michelle LaPlaca's lab at Georgia Institute of Technology is involved in the study of mechanical stretch of cell cultures, shear deformation of planar cell cultures, and shear deformation of 3D cell containing matrices.  Understanding of these processes is followed by development of functioning models capable of characterizing these systems under closed loop conditions with specially defined parameters.  The study of neuromechanics is aimed at improving treatments for physiological health problems which includes optimization of prostheses design, restoration of movement post injury, and design and control of mobile robots. By studying structures in 3D hydrogels, researchers can identify new models of nerve cell mechanoproperties.  For example, LaPlaca et al. developed a new model showing that strain may play a role in cell culture (LaPlaca et al. 2005).

Neuromodulation 
Neuromodulation aims to treat disease or injury by employing medical device technologies that would enhance or suppress activity of the nervous system with the delivery of pharmaceutical agents, electrical signals, or other forms of energy stimulus to re-establish balance in impaired regions of the brain.  Researchers in this field face the challenge of linking advances in understanding neural signals to advancements in technologies delivering and analyzing these signals with increased sensitivity, biocompatibility, and viability in closed loops schemes in the brain such that new treatments and clinical applications can be created to treat those with neural damage of various kinds. Neuromodulator devices can correct nervous system dysfunction related to Parkinson's disease, dystonia, tremor, Tourette's, chronic pain, OCD, severe depression, and eventually epilepsy. 
Neuromodulation is appealing as treatment for varying defects because it focuses in on treating highly specific regions of the brain only, contrasting that of systemic treatments that can have side effects on the body.  Neuromodulator stimulators such as microelectrode arrays can stimulate and record brain function and with further improvements are meant to become adjustable and responsive delivery devices for drugs and other stimuli.

Neural regrowth and repair 
Neural engineering and rehabilitation applies neuroscience and engineering to investigating peripheral and central nervous system function and to finding clinical solutions to problems created by brain damage or malfunction. Engineering applied to neuroregeneration focuses on engineering devices and materials that facilitate the growth of neurons for specific applications such as the regeneration of peripheral nerve injury, the regeneration of the spinal cord tissue for spinal cord injury, and the regeneration of retinal tissue. Genetic engineering and tissue engineering are areas developing scaffolds for spinal cord to regrow across thus helping neurological problems (Schmidt & Leach 2003).

Research and applications 
Research focused on neural engineering utilizes devices to study how the nervous system functions and malfunctions (Schmidt & Leach 2003).

Neural imaging 
Neuroimaging techniques are used to investigate the activity of neural networks, as well as the structure and function of the brain.  Neuroimaging technologies include functional magnetic resonance imaging (fMRI), magnetic resonance imaging (MRI), positron emission tomography (PET) and computed axial tomography (CAT) scans.  Functional neuroimaging studies are interested in which areas of the brain perform specific tasks.  fMRI measures hemodynamic activity that is closely linked to neural activity.  It is used to map metabolic responses in specific regions of the brain to a given task or stimulus.  PET, CT scanners, and electroencephalography (EEG) are currently being improved and used for similar purposes.

Neural networks 
Scientists can use experimental observations of neuronal systems and theoretical and computational models of these systems to create Neural networks with the hopes of modeling neural systems in as realistic a manner as possible.  Neural networks can be used for analyses to help design further neurotechnological devices.  Specifically, researchers handle analytical or finite element modeling to determine nervous system control of movements and apply these techniques to help patients with brain injuries or disorders. Artificial neural networks can be built from theoretical and computational models and implemented on computers from theoretically devices equations or experimental results of observed behavior of neuronal systems.  Models might represent ion concentration dynamics, channel kinetics, synaptic transmission, single neuron computation, oxygen metabolism, or application of dynamic system theory (LaPlaca et al. 2005). Liquid-based template assembly was used to engineer 3D neural networks from neuron-seeded microcarrier beads.

Neural interfaces 
Neural interfaces are a major element used for studying neural systems and enhancing or replacing neuronal function with engineered devices.  Engineers are challenged with developing electrodes that can selectively record from associated electronic circuits to collect information about the nervous system activity and to stimulate specified regions of neural tissue to restore function or sensation of that tissue (Cullen et al. 2011). The materials used for these devices must match the mechanical properties of neural tissue in which they are placed and the damage must be assessed.  Neural interfacing involves temporary regeneration of biomaterial scaffolds or chronic electrodes and must manage the body's response to foreign materials. Microelectrode arrays are recent advances that can be used to study neural networks (Cullen & Pfister 2011).  Optical neural interfaces involve optical recordings and optogenetics, making certain brain cells sensitive to light in order to modulate their activity.  Fiber optics can be implanted in the brain to stimulate or silence targeted neurons using light, as well as record photon activity—a proxy of neural activity— instead of using electrodes.  Two-photon excitation microscopy can study living neuronal networks and the communicatory events among neurons.

Brain–computer interfaces 
Brain–computer interfaces seek to directly communicate with human nervous system to monitor and stimulate neural circuits as well as diagnose and treat intrinsic neurological dysfunction. Deep brain stimulation is a significant advance in this field that is especially effective in treating movement disorders such as Parkinson's disease with high frequency stimulation of neural tissue to suppress tremors (Lega et al. 2011).

Microsystems 
Neural microsystems can be developed to interpret and deliver electrical, chemical, magnetic, and optical signals to neural tissue. They can detect variations in membrane potential and measure electrical properties such as spike population, amplitude, or rate by using electrodes, or by assessment of chemical concentrations, fluorescence light intensity, or magnetic field potential.  The goal of these systems is to deliver signals that would influence neuronal tissue potential and thus stimulate the brain tissue to evoke a desired response (He 2005).

Microelectrode arrays 
Microelectrode arrays are specific tools used to detect the sharp changes in voltage in the extracellular environments that occur from propagation of an action potential down an axon.  Dr. Mark Allen and Dr. LaPlaca have microfabricated 3D electrodes out of cytocompatible materials such as SU-8 and SLA polymers which have led to the development of in vitro and in vivo microelectrode systems with the characteristics of high compliance and flexibility to minimize tissue disruption.

Neural prostheses 
Neuroprosthetics are devices capable of supplementing or replacing missing functions of the nervous system by stimulating the nervous system and recording its activity.  Electrodes that measure firing of nerves can integrate with prosthetic devices and signal them to perform the function intended by the transmitted signal.   Sensory prostheses use artificial sensors to replace neural input that might be missing from biological sources (He 2005).  Engineers researching these devices are charged with providing a chronic, safe, artificial interface with neuronal tissue.  Perhaps the most successful of these sensory prostheses is the cochlear implant which has restored hearing abilities to the deaf.  Visual prosthesis for restoring visual capabilities of blind persons is still in more elementary stages of development.  Motor prosthesics are devices involved with electrical stimulation of biological neural muscular system that can substitute for control mechanisms of the brain or spinal cord.  Smart prostheses can be designed to replace missing limbs controlled by neural signals by transplanting nerves from the stump of an amputee to muscles.  Sensory prosthetics provide sensory feedback by transforming mechanical stimuli from the periphery into encoded information accessible by the nervous system.  Electrodes placed on the skin can interpret signals and then control the prosthetic limb.  These prosthetics have been very successful. Functional electrical stimulation (FES) is a system aimed at restoring motor processes such as standing, walking, and hand grasp.

Neurorobotics 
Neurorobotics is the study of how neural systems can be embodied and movements emulated in mechanical machines.  Neurorobots are typically used to study motor control and locomotion, learning and memory selection, and value systems and action selection.  By studying neurorobots in real-world environments, they are more easily observed and assessed to describe heuristics of robot function in terms of its embedded neural systems and the reactions of these systems to its environment (Krichmar 2008).
For instance, making use of a computational model of epilectic spike-wave dynamics, it has been already proven the effectiveness of a method to simulate seizure abatement through a pseudospectral protocol. The computational model emulates the brain connectivity by using a magnetic imaging resonance from a patient with idiopathic generalized epilepsy. The method was able to generate stimuli able to lessen the seizures.

Neural tissue regeneration 
Neural tissue regeneration, or neuroregeneration looks to restore function to those neurons that have been damaged in small injuries and larger injuries like those caused by traumatic brain injury.  Functional restoration of damaged nerves involves re-establishment of a continuous pathway for regenerating axons to the site of innervation.  Researchers like Dr. LaPlaca at Georgia Institute of Technology are looking to help find treatment for repair and regeneration after traumatic brain injury and spinal cord injuries by applying tissue engineering strategies.  Dr. LaPlaca is looking into methods combining neural stem cells with an extracellular matrix protein based scaffold for minimally invasive delivery into the irregular shaped lesions that form after a traumatic insult.  By studying the neural stem cells in vitro and exploring alternative cell sources, engineering novel biopolymers that could be utilized in a scaffold, and investigating cell or tissue engineered construct transplants in vivo in models of traumatic brain and spinal cord injury, Dr. LaPlaca's lab aims to identify optimal strategies for nerve regeneration post injury.

Current approaches to clinical treatment 
End to end surgical suture of damaged nerve ends can repair small gaps with autologous nerve grafts.  For larger injuries, an autologous nerve graft that has been harvested from another site in the body might be used, though this process is time-consuming, costly and requires two surgeries (Schmidt & Leach 2003).  Clinical treatment for CNS is minimally available and focuses mostly on reducing collateral damage caused by bone fragments near the site of injury or inflammation.  After swelling surrounding injury lessens, patients undergo rehabilitation so that remaining nerves can be trained to compensate for the lack of nerve function in injured nerves.  No treatment currently exists to restore nerve function of CNS nerves that have been damaged (Schmidt & Leach 2003).

Engineering strategies for repair 
Engineering strategies for the repair of spinal cord injury are focused on creating a friendly environment for nerve regeneration.  Only PNS nerve damage has been clinically possible so far, but advances in research of genetic techniques and biomaterials demonstrate the potential for SC nerves to regenerate in permissible environments.

Grafts 
Advantages of autologous tissue grafts are that they come from natural materials which have a high likelihood of biocompatibility while providing structural support to nerves that encourage cell adhesion and migration (Schmidt & Leach 2003). Nonautologous tissue, acellular grafts, and extracellular matrix based materials are all options that may also provide ideal scaffolding for nerve regeneration.  Some come from allogenic or xenogenic tissues that must be combined with immunosuppressants. while others include small intestinal submucosa and amniotic tissue grafts (Schmidt & Leach 2003). Synthetic materials are attractive options because their physical and chemical properties can typically be controlled.  A challenge that remains with synthetic materials is biocompatibility (Schmidt & Leach 2003). Methylcellulose-based constructs have been shown to be a biocompatible option serving this purpose (Tate et al. 2001).
AxoGen uses a cell graft technology AVANCE to mimic a human nerve.  It has been shown to achieve meaningful recovery in 87 percent of patients with peripheral nerve injuries.

Nerve guidance channels 
Nerve guidance channels, Nerve guidance conduit are innovative strategies focusing on larger defects that provide a conduit for sprouting axons directing growth and reducing growth inhibition from scar tissue. Nerve guidance channels must be readily formed into a conduit with the desired dimensions, sterilizable, tear resistant, and easy to handle and suture (Schmidt & Leach 2003). Ideally they would degrade over time with nerve regeneration, be pliable, semipermeable, maintain their shape, and have a smooth inner wall that mimics that of a real nerve (Schmidt & Leach 2003).

Biomolecular therapies 
Highly controlled delivery systems are needed to promote neural regeneration.  Neurotrophic factors can influence development, survival, outgrowth, and branching.  Neurotrophins include nerve growth factor (NGF), brain derived neurotrophic factor (BDNF), neurotrophin-3 (NT-3) and neurotrophin-4/5 (NT-4/5).  Other factors are ciliary neurotrophic factor (CNTF), glial cell line-derived growth factor (GDNF) and acidic and basic fibroblast growth factor (aFGF, bFGF) that promote a range of neural responses.(Schmidt & Leach 2003)  Fibronectin has also been shown to support nerve regeneration following TBI in rats (Tate et al. 2002). Other therapies are looking into regeneration of nerves by upregulating regeneration associated genes (RAGs), neuronal cytoskeletal components, and antiapoptosis factors. RAGs include GAP-43 and Cap-23, adhesion molecules such as L1 family, NCAM, and N-cadherin (Schmidt & Leach 2003).
There is also the potential for blocking inhibitory biomolecules in the CNS due to glial scarring.  Some currently being studied are treatments with chondroitinase ABC and blocking NgR, ADP-ribose (Schmidt & Leach 2003).

Delivery techniques 
Delivery devices must be biocompatible and stable in vivo.  Some examples include osmotic pumps, silicone reservoirs, polymer matrices, and microspheres. Gene therapy techniques have also been studied to provide long-term production of growth factors and could be delivered with viral or non-viral vectors such as lipoplexes. Cells are also effective delivery vehicles for ECM components, neurotrophic factors and cell adhesion molecules. Olfactory ensheathing cells (OECs) and stem cells as well as genetically modified cells have been used as transplants to support nerve regeneration (LaPlaca et al. 2005, Schmidt & Leach 2003, Tate et al. 2002).

Advanced therapies 
Advanced therapies combine complex guidance channels and multiple stimuli that focus on internal structures that mimic the nerve architecture containing internal matrices of longitudinally aligned fibers or channels.  Fabrication of these structures can use a number of technologies: magnetic polymer fiber alignment, injection molding, phase separation, solid free-form fabrication, and ink jet polymer printing (Schmidt & Leach 2003).

Neural enhancement 
Augmentation of human neural systems, or human enhancement using engineering techniques is another possible application of neuroengineering. Deep brain stimulation has already been shown to enhance memory recall as noted by patients currently using this treatment for neurological disorders.  Brain stimulation techniques are postulated to be able to sculpt emotions and personalities as well as enhance motivation, reduce inhibitions, etc. as requested by the individual.  Ethical issues with this sort of human augmentation are a new set of questions that neural engineers have to grapple with as these studies develop.

See also 
 Brain–computer interface
 Brain-reading
 Cybernetics
 Cyberware
 Neuroprosthetics
 Neurosecurity
 Neurotechnology
 Prosthetic neuronal memory silicon chips
 Sensory substitution
 Simulated reality

References

 
 
 
 
 Edwards DH. 2010. Neuromechanical simulation. Front Behav Neurosci 4
 Eliasmith C, Anderson CH. 2003. Neural engineering : computation, representation, and dynamics in neurobiological systems. Cambridge, Mass.: MIT Press. xii, 356 p. pp.
 He B. 2005. Neural engineering. New York: Kluwer Academic/Plenum. xv, 488 p. pp.
 
 
 
 
 
 
 
 
 
 
 Neural Engineering (Bioelectric Engineering) (2005) 
 Operative Neuromodulation: Volume 1: Functional Neuroprosthetic Surgery. An Introduction (2007) 
 Deep Brain Stimulation for Parkinson's Disease (2007) 
 Handbook of Stereotactic and Functional Neurosurgery (2003) 
 Neural Prostheses: Fundamental Studies (1990) 
 IEEE Handbook of Neural Engineering (2007) 
 Foundations on Cellular Neurophysiology (1995)

External links

IEEE Transactions on Biomedical Engineering
IEEE Transactions on Neural Systems and Rehabilitation Engineering
The Journal of Neural Engineering
JNER Journal of NeuroEngineering and Rehabilitation
Journal of Neurophysiology